Janja Gora is a village in the municipality of Plaški, in the Lika region of Croatia. It is located 9 km northeast of the municipal seat at Plaški.

It was historically known as Tuk. Prior to the administrative reorganization of SR Croatia, it was part of the municipality of Ogulin. During the Croatian War of Independence, the region was occupied by rebel Serbs. The village is ecclesiastically part of the Serbian Orthodox Eparchy of upper Karlovac. The village has a Serbian majority.

Omar Pasha (1806–1871), the Ottoman general and governor, was born in the village.

References

Populated places in Karlovac County
History of the Serbs of Croatia
Serb communities in Croatia